Park Circus is a film distributor based in the United Kingdom, and operating internationally. The company specialises in the distribution of classic and back catalogue / repertory films for theatrical exhibition. They represent over 25,000 films from Hollywood and British studios and a large number of independent rights owners.

They have also released contemporary films such as Kelly Reichardt's Certain Women and Nicolas Pesce's The Eyes of My Mother (2016).

Film Libraries
Park Circus represents over 20,000 titles, including the following film libraries and collections:
 20th Century Studios
 Arrow Films
 American International Pictures
 Cannon
 Cinerama Releasing Corporation
 FilmFour International
 First Independent Films
 Gainsborough Pictures
 Gaumont British
 HandMade Films
 Icon Entertainment International
 ITV Studios Global Entertainment (in conjunction with Shout! Factory’s Westchester Films division)
 Laika, LLC 
 MGM/UA
 Network (DVD label)
 New Zealand Film Commission
 Orion Pictures
 Paramount Pictures
 PolyGram Filmed Entertainment
 Rank Organization
 Revolution Studios
 The Samuel Goldwyn Company
 Sony Pictures (Columbia Pictures, Screen Gems, Sony Pictures Classics, and TriStar Pictures)
 Universal Pictures
 Village Roadshow Pictures
 Walt Disney Studios Motion Pictures UK 
 Warner Bros.

References

External links
Official website

Mass media companies established in 2003
Film distributors of the United Kingdom
Companies based in Glasgow